Billy Connolly's Musical Tour of New Zealand is the soundtrack to the television series Billy Connolly's World Tour of New Zealand, released in 2004.

Track listing
Billy's Bobby Theme
Billy's Fast Waltz
Billy's Slow Waltz
Billy's Reel
Banjo Reel
Wandering Soul
Billy's Breton
Shaeffer's Jig
Billy's Strathspey
The Rose of Sharon
Billy's Jig
Carnival of Venice
Billy's Slow air
Billy's March
The Cuckoo
The Rose of Sharon 2
Pokarekare ana

External links
Official Billy Connolly website
Official John McCusker website

2004 soundtrack albums
Television soundtracks
Billy Connolly albums